DISD may refer to:
 Texas school districts with the acronym "DISD"
 Dallas Independent School District
 Dayton Independent School District
 German International School Dubai (Deutsche Internationale Schule Dubai)